Udachino is a rural locality (a village) in Verkhnevarzhenskoye Rural Settlement, Velikoustyugsky District, Vologda Oblast, Russia. The population was 27 as of 2002.

Geography 
Udachino is located 70 km southeast of Veliky Ustyug (the district's administrative centre) by road. Makarovo is the nearest rural locality.

References 

Rural localities in Velikoustyugsky District